William Grantham (19 October 1880 – 12 November 1942) was a British middle-distance runner. He competed in the men's 3200 metres steeplechase at the 1908 Summer Olympics.

References

1880 births
1942 deaths
Athletes (track and field) at the 1908 Summer Olympics
British male middle-distance runners
British male steeplechase runners
Olympic athletes of Great Britain
Place of birth missing
People from Wilmslow